Thottipal Bhagavati Temple is a Bhagavathi temple located in Thrissur District of Kerala state. It is one of the 108 Devi temples installed by Parashurama. The temple was destroyed in the attacks by Tipu Sultan and was renovated in the late 19th century.

References

Hindu temples in Thrissur district
Bhagavathi temples in Kerala